Joseph Sweeney (July 26, 1884 (other sources state 1882) – November 25, 1963) was an American actor who worked in stage productions, television and movies. His best-known role was as the elderly Juror #9 in the 1957 classic 12 Angry Men, the role he originated in a 1954 Westinghouse Studio One live teleplay of which the film was an adaptation.

Stage career 
Born in Philadelphia, Sweeney debuted on stage in stock theater with a company in Norwich, Connecticut. He had a successful career as a stage performer in such productions as The Clansmen, George Washington Slept Here, Ladies and Gentlemen, A Slight Case of Murder, Dear Old Darlin, and Days To Remember. In the 1940s he made the switch to television as audiences' interests changed. He returned to the stage in 1953 to portray Giles Corey in Arthur Miller's The Crucible.

Later life 
Sweeney kept acting until his death, appearing in numerous television shows, including at least twelve during the last year of his life. He died on November 25, 1963, at the age of 79.

Filmography

Television

Films

References

External links 

Biography by New York Times
Biography by Fandango (ticket service)

1880s births
1963 deaths
American male television actors
20th-century American male actors
Male actors from Philadelphia
American male film actors
American male stage actors